Sean Carl Roland Pertwee (born 4 June 1964) is an English actor, narrator and producer with an extensive career since the 1980s in television and cinema productions. 

He is known for the role of Sgt. Wells in the film Dog Soldiers, W.F. "Smitty" Smith in Event Horizon, Inspector Lestrade in CBS's Elementary and Alfred Pennyworth in Fox's Gotham. He is also the narrator of MasterChef: The Professionals and Zero Hour.

Early life
Pertwee was born on 4 June 1964 in Hammersmith, London, the son of the actor Jon Pertwee (who played the Third Doctor in Doctor Who) and his German second wife, Ingeborg Rhoesa. Playwright and screenwriter Roland Pertwee was his grandfather; his sister is actress Dariel Pertwee, and Dad's Army actor Bill Pertwee was a cousin.

Pertwee received his formal education at Teddington Boys' School in Richmond upon Thames and Sunbury College, Surrey.

Career
Pertwee trained at Bristol Old Vic Theatre School. After graduating in 1986, he toured with the Royal Shakespeare Company for three years. He appeared in Agatha Christie's Hercule Poirot – The King of Clubs alongside David Suchet (12 March 1989). He later appeared as Hugh Beringar alongside Derek Jacobi in the first series of the television series Cadfael in 1994. In 1999 he portrayed Brutus in the Hallmark Channel film Cleopatra. He co-owned the Natural Nylon film production company along with Sadie Frost, Jude Law, Jonny Lee Miller, and Ewan McGregor. The company folded in 2003. Pertwee is perhaps best known for his portrayal of grimacing death, particularly in the film Dog Soldiers, a skill which led to him being given an award for 'Best Death Face' at Bristol Old Vic.

He appeared in the 2008 film Doomsday as Doctor Talbot. His voice is frequently heard in a variety of television commercials, documentaries and video games, including the medieval empire-building computer game Medieval: Total War and futuristic war games Killzone (as Colonel Gregor Hakha), Killzone 2 (as Colonel Mael Radec) and Fire Warrior (as Governor Severus). He is also the voice behind the Northeast's tourism advertisement which started broadcasting at the start of 2009. He is the narrator of Masterchef: The Professionals, replacing India Fisher from the fourth series onwards.
He starred alongside John Hurt as Brother Proteus in the 2010 animated film Ultramarines: a Warhammer 40,000 Movie.
He appeared in the film Devil's Playground, a horror film directed by Mark McQueen. He starred alongside Danny Dyer, Jaime Murray, Janet Montgomery and Craig Fairbrass. The film was released in October 2010. Pertwee appeared in the Nazi zombie film The 4th Reich which he filmed in 2010, directed by Shaun Smith.

Pertwee has been in several dramatic works for BBC Radio 4, including playing the actor Oliver Reed in the play Burning Both Ends by Matthew Broughton in 2011.

In 2014, he was cast in Fox's TV series Gotham, a series presenting an origin for the characters of the Batman franchise. Pertwee portrays Alfred Pennyworth, an ex-special forces soldier from London who works as the Wayne family's loyal butler. After Thomas and Martha Wayne are murdered, he becomes guardian and mentor to the future Batman.

Personal life
Pertwee married Jacqueline Jane "Jacqui" Hamilton-Smith, a make-up artist, daughter of Anthony Hamilton-Smith, on 12 June 1999 at the House of Lords. His wife gave birth to twins, around Christmas 2001. They were born prematurely; one dying four days later.

Politics

Pertwee presented a television party political broadcast on behalf of the Labour Party in the 2010 UK general election.

Filmography

Film

Television

Theatre

Radio

Video games

Notes

References

External links
 
 
 

1964 births
21st-century English male actors
Living people
Alumni of Bristol Old Vic Theatre School
English male film actors
English male television actors
English male voice actors
English people of French descent
English people of German descent
Labour Party (UK) people
Male actors from London
People educated at Teddington School
People from Hammersmith
Sean
Royal Shakespeare Company members